Tomaz Feuk Eriksson (born March 23, 1967) is a former Swedish professional ice hockey player who played in the Swedish Hockey League (SHL). Eriksson was drafted in the fourth round of the 1987 NHL Entry Draft by the Philadelphia Flyers, but he never played professionally in North America. He spent his entire professional career in Sweden, playing six seasons in the SHL with the Djurgårdens IF and Södertälje SK.

References

External links

1967 births
Living people
Djurgårdens IF Hockey players
Huddinge IK players
Philadelphia Flyers draft picks
Södertälje SK players
Ice hockey people from Stockholm
Swedish ice hockey left wingers